is a former Japanese football player. He played for Japan national team.

Yamada mainly played on the right as a defender or midfielder. He spent his entire professional career at Urawa Reds of J1 League with more than 500 league appearances. He earned 15 caps playing for Japan.

Club career
Yamada was educated at and played for Fujieda Higashi High School. After graduating from high school, he joined Urawa Reds in 1994. He made his first league appearance on 27 April 1994 against Shimizu S-Pulse at Kusanagi Athletic Stadium. His first professional goal came on 19 November 1994 against Yokohama Marinos at Toyama Stadium.

Although he mainly played as a right-side defender or midfielder, he had also played as a stopper, libero, and attacking midfielder. He played more than 500 league matches for Urawa and also served captain from 2004 to 2008. The club won the champions 2006 J1 League, 2003 J.League Cup, 2005 and 2006 Emperor's Cup. In Asia, the club won the champions 2007 AFC Champions League and the 3rd place 2007 FIFA Club World Cup.

He announced his retirement from the game at the end of the 2013 season.

National team career
Yamada represented Japan at several underage levels. He was a member of the Japan U-20 national team for the 1995 FIFA World Youth Championship hosted by Qatar. He played all 4 matches as right midfielder and scored a goal against Burundi.

He made his full international debut for Japan on 20 November 2002 in a friendly against Argentine at Saitama Stadium 2002. In 2003, he played most matches as right side-back including 2003 Confederations Cup. His first international goal came on 7 February 2004 in a friendly against Malaysia at Kashima Soccer Stadium. He played 15 games and scored 1 goal for Japan until 2004.

Club statistics

1Includes J.League Championship, Japanese Super Cup, A3 Champions Cup and FIFA Club World Cup.

National team statistics

National team goals
Scores and results list Japan's goal tally first.

Under-20

Senior team

Honours

Club
Urawa Red Diamonds
AFC Champions League: 1
 2007
J1 League: 1
 2006
Emperor's Cup: 2
 2005, 2006
J.League Cup: 1
 2003
Japanese Super Cup: 1
 2006

See also
List of one-club men

References

External links
 
 
 
 Japan National Football Team Database
  
 Nobuhisa Yamada – Urawa Red Diamonds official site 
 Nobuhisa Yamada – Yahoo! Japan sports profile 

1975 births
Living people
Association football people from Shizuoka Prefecture
Japanese footballers
Japan youth international footballers
Japan international footballers
J1 League players
J2 League players
Urawa Red Diamonds players
2003 FIFA Confederations Cup players
Association football defenders
Association football midfielders
People from Fujieda, Shizuoka